Tillandsia xerographica is a species of bromeliad that is native to southern Mexico, El Salvador, Guatemala and Honduras.  The name is derived from the Greek words ξηρός (xeros), meaning "dry", and γραφία (graphia), meaning "writing". It is included in Tillandsia subg. Tillandsia.

Description 

Tillandsia  xerographica is a slow-growing, xerophytic epiphyte. The inflorescence, on a thick, green stem,  in height, densely branched. The leaf bracts are rosy red; the floral bracts are chartreuse; and the petals of the tubular flowers are red to purple and are very long lasting (months).

Habitat 

Tillandsia  xerographica inhabits dry forests and thorn scrub at elevations of 140 to 600 m in southern Mexico, Guatemala and El Salvador. Average temperatures in its habitat range from 22 °C – 28 °C, with relative humidity between 60% to 72% and annual precipitation between 550 and 800 mm. It grows epiphytically on the highest branches, where it receive intense lighting.

Cultivars 
 Tillandsia 'Betty' (T. xerographica × T. brachycaulos)
 Tillandsia 'Fireworks' (T. xerographica × T. roland-gosselinii)
 Tillandsia 'Silver Queen' (T. jalisco-monticola × T. xerographica)
 Tillandsia 'Silverado' (T. chiapensis × T. xerographica)

References 

xerographica
Plants described in 1953
Flora of El Salvador
Flora of Guatemala
Flora of Honduras
Flora of Southeastern Mexico
Flora of Southwestern Mexico
Epiphytes